US Post Office-Fort Plain is a historic post office building located at Fort Plain in Montgomery County, New York, United States. It was built in 1931, and is one of a number of post offices in New York State designed by the Office of the Supervising Architect of the Treasury Department under James A. Wetmore.  It is a two-story, symmetrical brick building with a one-story rear wing in the Colonial Revival style.  It features a shallow projecting frontispiece framed by four brick pilasters and a pair of Grecian style lamps with glass globes.

It was listed on the National Register of Historic Places in 1989.  It is located in the Fort Plain Historic District.

References

Fort Plain
Government buildings completed in 1931
Colonial Revival architecture in New York (state)
Buildings and structures in Montgomery County, New York
National Register of Historic Places in Montgomery County, New York
Historic district contributing properties in New York (state)
1931 establishments in New York (state)